The Oklahoma–Arkansas–Kansas League was an eight–team Class D level minor baseball league that existed in 1907. As its name indicates, it consisted of teams from Oklahoma, Arkansas and Kansas.

Its teams were the Bartlesville Boosters, Coffeyville Glassblowers, Fort Smith Soldiers, Independence Champs, McAlester Miners, Muskogee Redskins, Parsons Preachers and Tulsa Oilers.

Notable players include Chick Brandom, Drummond Brown, Larry Cheney, Frank Moore, Art Thomason and Lon Ury. Baseball Hall of Fame member Jake Beckley managed the Tulsa Oilers.

After multiple teams disbanded and withdrew, the league's season was shortened to mid–September. Bartlesville finished in first place.

Cities represented 
 Bartlesville, OK: Bartlesville Boosters 1907 
 Coffeyville, KS: Coffeyville Glassblowers 1907 
 Fort Smith, AR: Fort Smith Soldiers 1907 
 Independence, KS: Independence Champs 1907 
 McAlester, OK: South McAlester Miners 1907 
 Muskogee, OK: Muskogee Redskins 1907 
 Parsons, KS: Parsons Preachers 1907 
 Tulsa, OK: Tulsa Oilers 1907

Standings and statistics 
1907 Oklahoma–Arkansas–Kansas League
schedule
 Parsons and South McAlester withdrew June 2; Ft. Smith and Tulsa disbanded August 6. The season was shortened to September 15.

References

Defunct minor baseball leagues in the United States
Baseball leagues in Oklahoma
Baseball leagues in Arkansas
Baseball leagues in Kansas
Sports leagues established in 1907
Sports leagues disestablished in 1907